The Stateburg Historic District is a historic district in Stateburg, in the High Hills of Santee area near Sumter, 
South Carolina in the United States. It includes two National Historic Landmarks, Borough House Plantation and the Church of the Holy Cross,  and at least eight contributing properties within its boundaries. On February 24, 1971, it was added to the National Register of Historic Places.

Description
The town of Stateburg was founded in 1783 by General Thomas Sumter, who hoped it would become the capital of the state, but it lost to Columbia by only a few votes. Previously the area had been used by people from Charleston to build summer homes to use  to escape the oppressive heat of the Lowcountry. It was the county seat of the former Claremont County from 1783 to 1800. Stateburg was a thriving community until April, 1865, when many of its buildings were destroyed by Union troops under Brigadier General Edward E. Potter.

Contributing Properties
Contributing properties include:
 Borough House Plantation
 Brookland Plantation
 Chapel of Ease — built for Natalie DeLage Sumter, daughter-in-law of General Thomas Sumter
 High Hills of Santee Baptist Church
 Maverick House
 Miller House, also known as  Ellison House — the home of Governor Stephen D. Miller, who sold it to William Ellison, a slave who had bought his freedom in 1816.
 Millwood Plantation
 Moorhill
 Oakland Plantation
 The Ruins — home of General Thomas Sumter in 1784. Despite its name, the home is still extant.
 Tomb of General Thomas Sumter — a South Carolina State Historic Site, managed as part of nearby Poinsett State Park.

See also
List of Registered Historic Places in South Carolina

References

External links 
 Commercial site giving National Register listings for Sumter County
 South Carolina Department of Archives and History file on Stateburg Historic District
 Map of Stateburg Historic District

Cemeteries in South Carolina
Geography of Sumter County, South Carolina
High Hills of Santee
Historic districts on the National Register of Historic Places in South Carolina
Buildings and structures in Sumter County, South Carolina
National Register of Historic Places in Sumter County, South Carolina